Little Snoring is a village and a civil parish  in Norfolk, England.

At the 2011 Census, it had a population of 619. For the purposes of local government, the parish falls within the district of North Norfolk.

History
Little Snoring has an entry in the Domesday Book of 1085 and is recorded by the names "Esnaringa", "Snaringa" and "Snarlinga", named after "Snare", the settlers' leader, and thus the name Little Snoring evolved over the centuries. It was the king's land with the main landholders being William de Warenne and Peter de Valognes and his main tenant is said to be Ralph.

Historically the name Snoring Parva was used, "parva" being Latin for "smaller" — nearby is Great Snoring.

Within the parish of Little Snoring, at a place called Queensgate, was a house of the Order of St Lazarus. It is mentioned in the will of Alexander, Rector of Snoring Parva, in 1380. Nothing further about the house is known.

Landmarks
The church of Little Snoring St Andrew is one of 124 existing round-tower churches in Norfolk. The church and its separate tower are Grade I listed buildings.

The village has an airfield, formerly RAF Little Snoring, part of which is still active as a private airfield, whilst the other part now belongs to a potato-producing company.

Amenities
Village amenities include a school, post office and the Green Man public house.

The nearest railway station is at Sheringham for the Bittern Line which runs between Sheringham, Cromer and Norwich. The nearest airport is Norwich International Airport.

References

External links

Little Snoring on the European Round Tower Churches website
"The Snoring Villages", The-snorings.co.uk
"Little Snoring Parish Council", Norfolk Rural Community Council 
"Little Snoring Primary School", Norfolk County Council

Villages in Norfolk
Civil parishes in Norfolk
North Norfolk